The Priory of St. Wigbert is an ecumenical Benedictine monastery for men, named after Saint Wigbert, belonging to the Lutheran Church of Thuringia. It is located in Werningshausen near Erfurt in Germany. This community includes the Congregatio Canonicorum Sancti Augustini.

Brethren in the priory are Lutheran, Roman Catholic and Eastern Orthodox, following the Rule of St Benedict. The prior is the Lutheran pastor Franz Schwarz.

See also
 Östanbäck monastery
 Communität Casteller Ring

References

, 

Monasteries in Thuringia
Benedictine monasteries in Germany
Lutheran monasteries in Germany
Christian ecumenical organizations
Buildings and structures in Sömmerda (district)